A statistext is a demographic category that is artificially contrived in pursuit of a political or ideological goal, particularly when categories are created that respondents would not otherwise apply to themselves. The term was created by Audrey Kobayashi, a Canadian geographer, in 1992.

Canada

Legal definitions
According to the Employment Equity Act of 1995, the definition of visible minority is:

This definition can be traced back to the 1984 Report of the Abella Commission on Equality in Employment. The Commission described the term visible minority as an "ambiguous categorization", but for practical purposes interpreted it to mean "visibly non-white".  The Canadian government uses an operational definition where they classify as visible minorities the following groups:  Blacks, Chinese, Filipinos, Japanese, Koreans, Latin Americans, Pacific Islanders, South Asians, and West Asians/Arabs.  However, a few exceptions are applied to some groups, according to the explanation given by the Visible Minority Population and Population Group Reference Guide of the 2006 Census, the exception is:

The use of the term "non-white" controversially refers to those who are not considered by the Canadian government to be Caucasian, and does open the door to ambiguity. For example, people who are Lebanese, Berber, Latin American or South Asian may consider themselves to be white, yet the federal government forcibly imposes upon Arabs and Latin Americans  the status of being visible minorities.

Examples of use
Examples of statistexts used by the Canadian government include the forced categorization of non-Europeans as  "visible minorities", particularly Caucasians from Western Asia, South Asia, and Latin America.
Another example of a statistext is the category "Canadian" as an ethnic choice on Canadian census forms. One demographer has speculated that as an ethnic identity, respondents might choose this to voice patriotism, or to rebel against ethnic classification, or to voice an anti-separatist opinion, and furthermore, that the term has very different connotations in English versus French. (See footnote 5 in.) These terms do not match the nomenclature such individuals would ordinarily apply to themselves, although sometimes statistexts gain acceptance among the people to whom the term is applied.

The nomenclature of minority groups has a number of effects. Statistexts can empower some ethnic or linguistic minorities in some instances, while marginalizing and prejudicing them in others. Some may be demoralized by the nomenclature applied to them, as when a Canadian feels the government-imposed "visible minority" label highlights one’s "outsider" or "exotic" background. In other instances, nomenclature applied to a minority group may enable them to present a united front for political mobilization.  Another problem is that these categories lump together distinct groups that might otherwise not perceive each other together in the same group.

Statistexts as state-sanctioned racism
The classification "visible minorities" has attracted controversy. In March 2007, the United Nations Convention on the Elimination of All Forms of Racial Discrimination described the term as racist because it singles out a group.

Another criticism arises regarding the composition of "visible minorities" as defined by the Canadian government. Critics have noted that the groups comprising "visible minorities" have little in common with each other, as they include some disadvantaged ethnic groups and other groups who are not disadvantaged. The concept of visible minority has been cited in demography research as an example of a statistext, i.e. a census category created for a particular public policy purpose.

Since 2008, census data and media reports have suggested that the "visible minorities" label no longer makes sense in some large Canadian cities due to immigration trends in recent decades.  For example, "visible minorities" actually comprise the majority of the population in Toronto, Vancouver, Markham, Richmond, Burnaby, Greater Vancouver A, and Brampton.  However, the term "visible minority"  is used for the administration of the Employment Equity Act, and refers to its statistical reality in Canada as a whole and not any particular region.

United States
In the United States, examples would be Hispanic and Latino Americans, Pacific Islander American and Asian American. The word "Indian", allegedly created by Christopher Columbus for the Indigenous people of the Americas may be considered as another example of a statistext.

See also
 Discrimination in Europe
 Employment equity (Canada)
 Ethnonym
 Hispanic-Latino naming dispute
 Orientalism
 Racial policy of Nazi Germany
 Visible minority

References

Naming controversies
Social groups
Minorities
Race and society
Society of Canada
Human rights in Canada
Affirmative action
Demographics
Ethnonyms
Politics and race
Race in Canada
Ethnic groups in Canada